Børge Søren Jørgensen Holm (7 December 1910 – 12 April 1971) was a Danish boxer who competed in the 1936 Summer Olympics.

He was born and died in Copenhagen.

In 1936 he was eliminated in the quarter-finals of the light heavyweight class after losing his fight to the upcoming gold medalist Roger Michelot.

External links
profile

1910 births
1971 deaths
Sportspeople from Copenhagen
Light-heavyweight boxers
Olympic boxers of Denmark
Boxers at the 1936 Summer Olympics
Danish male boxers